Leptolalax tadungensis is a species of frogs in the family Megophryidae.

References

tadungensis
Amphibians described in 2016